Phil Nice (born 6 April 1954 in Vange, Essex) is a British actor who has been active in television and films since 1984.

He has appeared in TV serials including Who Dares Wins, South of the Border, Inspector Morse, Mr. Bean, Goodnight Sweetheart, The Bill, EastEnders, Heartbeat, The Inbetweeners (as a driving instructor), Coming of Age, Moving Wallpaper, Love Soup, Torchwood: Miracle Day, My Family, Hebburn and Citizen Khan (as friendly neighbour Keith). He also appeared in Morrison's adverts in 2011.

He has appeared in films including Ident, Danny the Champion of the World, Magicians and A Kind of Hush.

In December, 1985, Nice, along with temporary comedy partner Arthur Smith made a short series of parody documentaries for Channel 4 called Arthur and Phil Go Off.

In 2014 Nice played an astronaut killed by giant spiders in 'Kill the Moon', the seventh episode of the eighth series of the science-fiction television show Doctor Who.

In January 2015 he appeared in series two of Broadchurch as Andrew Darlington, the manager of the care home looking after Jocelyn Knight's elderly mother.

Filmography

Film

Television

Video games

Podcasts

External links

1954 births
Living people
People from Essex
British male television actors
British male film actors